The Administrator of Affairs of the Council of People's Commissars of the Soviet Union and Council of Labour and Defense, or Secretary to the Premier, was a high-standing officer within the Soviet Government whose main task was to co-sign,  with the Premier of the Soviet Union, decrees and resolutions made by the All-Union government. The government apparatus (office of government affairs) prepared items of policy, which the office holder would check systematically against decrees of the Party-Government. This function consisted of several departments and other structural units. The Soviet government apparatus was headed by the Administrator of Affairs who, in accordance with the established order, was a member of the federal government body.

List of administrators

Notes

References

Administrator of Affairs
Affairs